Sonora High School is a public high school located in Sonora, Texas and classified as a 3A school by the UIL.  It is part of the Sonora Independent School District which covers all of Sutton County.   In 2013, the school was rated "Met Standard" by the Texas Education Agency.

Athletics
The Sonora Broncos compete in the following sports 

Cross Country, Volleyball, Football, Basketball, Golf, Powerlifting, Tennis, Track, Baseball & Softball

State Titles

Football 
1966(1A), 1968(1A), 1970(1A), 1971(1A)^, 2000(2A)
Girls Golf 
2012(2A), 2014 (3A), 2015 (3A), 2016 (3A), 2017 (3A)
Boys Track 
1973(1A)
One Act Play 
2006 Unexpected Tenderness (2A)
1993 The Marriage of Bette and Boo (3A)
1973 The Apollo of Bellac (1A)
1971 The Mad Woman of Chaillot (1A)

^ Score in ended in tie - were co-champions

Notable alumni

Bill Ratliff
Bill Shirley

References

External links
Sonora Independent School District

Schools in Sutton County, Texas
Public high schools in Texas